The list of Oregon ballot measures lists all statewide ballot measures to the present.

In Oregon, the initiative and referendum process dates back to 1902, when the efforts of the Direct Legislation League prompted amending the Oregon Constitution for the first time since 1859. The process of initiative and referendum became nationally known as the Oregon System.

Types 
There are three types of ballot measures: initiatives, referendums, and referrals. Initiatives and referendums may be placed on the ballot if their supporters gather enough signatures from Oregon voters; the number of signatures is a percentage based on the number of voters casting ballots in the most recent election for the Governor of Oregon.

 Initiative Any issue may be placed before the voters, either amending the Constitution or revising or adding to the Oregon Revised Statutes. Constitutional initiatives require the signature of eight percent of recent voters to qualify for the ballot; statutory reforms require six percent.
 Referendum The public may act to undo any bill passed by the Oregon Legislative Assembly, by putting a referendum on the ballot. A referendum requires four percent of recent voters to qualify for the ballot.
 Legislative referral The Legislative Assembly may refer any bill it passes to the public for approval, and they must do so for any amendment to the Constitution. Additionally, the Legislative Assembly may refer revisions to the Constitution; a revision differs from an amendment in that it may alter multiple existing provisions of the Constitution.

The constitutional foundation for ballot measures (and legislation produced by the Oregon Legislative Assembly) may be found in Article IV of the Oregon Constitution, and Chapter 250 of the Oregon Revised Statutes relates to initiative and referendum as well.

The Oregon Blue Book, produced by the Oregon government, maintains a list similar to this one.

1900s

1902

1904

1906

1908

1910s

1912

1913

1914

1916

1917

1918

1919

1920s

1921

1922

1923

1924

1926

1927

1928

1930s

1932

1933

1934

1934

1936

1938

1940s

1942

1944

1945

1946

1947

1948

1950s

1952

1954

1956

1958

1960s

1962

1963

1964

1966

1968

1969

1970s

1972

 7 — Repealed Governors Retirement Act that was created through House Bill 1728 in 1971 that provided lifetime pensions for Oregon Governors who served at least two years. The measure passed with little objection.

1973

1974

1976

1977

1978

1980s

1982

1984

1985

1986

1987

1988
May 17, 1988 primary election

November 8, 1988 general election

1989
May 16 Special Election

June 27 Special Election

1990s

1990

May

November

1992

May

November

1993

June

November

1994

May

November

Note: Detailed information about elections from 1995 to the present, including ballot measure text, sponsorship, and arguments for and against, may be found at the Oregon Secretary of State's web site.

1995

May

1996

May

November

November 5 General Election

1997

May

November

1998

May

November

1999

November

2000s

 2000 

May

November

2002

May

September

November
General Election: Detailed information on Measures 14-18 and 21-27, and official election results available at the Secretary of State's web site.

2003

January

September

2004

February

November

In the fall election, Measure 36 (outlawing gay marriage) dominated public attention: 81,667 (or 4.7%) more votes were cast on Measure 36 than the average of all other measures on the ballot. Measure 37 (restricting land use regulation) was contentious before the election, and became more controversial after the fact, as state and local governments attempted to implement it.

Two other measures passed in 2004, both referred by the Legislature for the General Election, and neither one drawing any opposition in the Voters' Pamphlet. Measure 31 made it possible to postpone certain elections in the event of a candidate's death, and Measure 32 changed the way revenue from mobile home taxes is handled.

2006

In 2006, voters considered 11 statewide ballot measures. All were placed on the ballot by initiative.

Nearly all the measures were defeated. Measures extending prescription drug pricing benefits (Measure 44) and restricting the government's power of eminent domain (39) were the only ones that passed without qualification; a campaign finance reform system (47) passed as well, but a companion measure (46) that would have provided necessary constitutional support for it failed.

Out-of-state interests spent millions of dollars supporting—and in one significant case, opposing—Oregon ballot measures. None of these big-money measures passed; in fact, Measures 39 and 44 passed without drawing any organized opposition.

Unsuccessful measures
Measures 41 and 48 aimed to restrict the amount of money the State government could raise and spend, respectively. They were both mostly funded by the Taxpayers Association of Oregon, which in turn received nearly all its funding from IlliNois-based Americans for Limited Government. Opposition to these two measures was paired as well, spending $1.9 million to defeat the two measures.

Measure 42 was promoted by conservative ballot measure activist Bill Sizemore. Sizemore broke with his custom by promoting a consumer-oriented bill, which would have outlawed the use of credit data in determining insurance premiums. Opponents of the measure spent over $3.7 million (nearly all of which came from out of state), defeating the measure. Their advertising focused heavily on Sizemore's credibility. Sizemore did not run an active campaign promoting the measure. He and his longtime political ally Loren Parks were the only people to submit arguments in favor for the Voters' Guide.

Measure 45, almost entirely financed by $1.2 million from IlliNois-based U.S. Term Limits, would have established strict term limits in the Oregon Legislative Assembly. Term limits had previously been in place in the late 1990s, but the prior law was declared unconstitutional by the Oregon Supreme Court. The measure failed.

Measures 46 and 47 were presented as a single package; 46 would have amended the Constitution to allow limitations on campaign financing (heavily favoring popular vote, and requiring a 75% vote for such changes in the Legislature); and 47 detailed specific limitations. Measure 47 passed, but in the absence of the kind of Constitutional support Measure 46 would have provided, it will have No effect. The campaigns both for and against this package were funded almost entirely from Oregon sources.

Measure 40 sought to require that judges of the Oregon Supreme Court be elected by district, rather than statewide.

Measure 43 sought to require parental Notification in the event of certain teenage abortions. (Two measures restricting abortion were also rejected in the 1990 general election.)

Successful measures
Measure 39, described by its proponents as a natural extension of 2004's Measure 37, restricted the governments powers of eminent domain. Measure 44 extended a state prescription drug benefit, previously only available to seniors, to cover all uninsured Oregonians.

2007

In 2007, voters considered 2 statewide ballot measures.

2008

May
Three measures (51, 52, and 53), all legislative referrals and all constitutional amendments, were on the May 2008 primary ballot. All three passed; the first two by wide margins, and Measure 53 by a margin so narrow that it triggered an automatic recount.

November
In November 2008, voters considered eight initiatives and four legislative referrals. The four referrals all passed, and the initiatives all failed.

 2010s 

2010

January

May

November

2012

November

2014

November

2016

May

November

2018

January

November

 2020s 
 2020 

2022

See also
List of California ballot propositions
List of Washington initiatives
Lists of Oregon-related topics
Government of Oregon

References

External links
 Election History from Oregon Blue Book List of Initiatives, Referenda, and Recalls, also from Oregon Blue Book''
 Oregon Secretary of State Elections Division
 Secretary of State's news release announcing what measures qualified for 2006 General Election ballot.
 Ballotpedia - Oregon Ballot Measures

 
Ballot measures
Oregon
ballot